Don Michael Burgess,  (born May 28, 1956) is an American cinematographer who was nominated for the Academy Award and BAFTA Award for Best Cinematography for Forrest Gump (1994), directed by frequent collaborator Robert Zemeckis. Burgess was director of photography for films such as Cast Away (2000), Spider-Man (2002), The Polar Express (2004), Enchanted (2007), Source Code (2011), The Muppets (2011), The Conjuring 2 (2016), and Aquaman (2018). He studied at the ArtCenter College of Design in Los Angeles.

Filmography

Director of photography 
Film

Television

Second unit director of photography

References

External links
 

1956 births
American cinematographers
Living people
People from Santa Monica, California